The Mayor of Bhopal is the first citizen of the city of Bhopal in Madhya Pradesh state of India. The mayor is the head of the civic body of Bhopal called Bhopal Municipal Corporation. For proper functioning of the corporation the mayor is supported by an officer called 'commissioner' who is vested with the required executive powers. The incumbent and tenth mayor of Bhopal is Malti Rai of the Bhartiya Janta Party.

Roles and Responsibilities
The mayor of Bhopal is city's first citizen and the head of the city's civic body, the "Bhopal Municipal Corporation (BMC)". He presides over the council meetings and takes decisions for the development of the city. For proper functioning of the corporation, he is supported by an officer who is appointed by the state government and designated as 'commissioner' who is vested with the required executive powers. The mayor is given a place of prominence at civic, government and social functions. The state government invites the mayor to receive the foreign dignitaries visiting the city. The post of mayor is considered as an important political milestone for a city politician.

Election
The mayor of Bhopal is elected directly by the citizens of Bhopal. Till 1998 the mayors in the state of Madhya Pradesh civic bodies were elected by the corporators. But in 1998, direct election of Mayor was introduced by the then state government. This decision was reversed by the subsequent government in September 2019. However the present government has again decided to have direct election of mayors of the civic bodies in the state. There are a total of 85 corporators in the civic body. In 2022 elections the Bhartiya Janta Party emerged as the party in power with 58 seats, while Congress party won 22 seats and independents won 5 seats.

Incumbent
The current mayor of Bhopal is Malti Rai of the Bhartiya Janta Party. She is the tenth mayor of the city. She is a former corporator. She did her intermediate education from Janta Kanya Umavi Shala Bina. She did her Bachelor's in Arts and Master's in Arts from Sofia College Bhopal.

References

Bhopal